Kathipara also known as S. Kathipara is a village in Idukki district, Kerala state, India. It is located near Kudukka city,  with a 1000-acre plantation adjacent to Neriamangalam forest.

References

Villages in Idukki district